Karolina Gočeva (born 28 April 1980), sometimes credited as Karolina Gocheva or known only as Karolina, is a Macedonian pop singer. Gočeva launched her music career in 1991 with a performance at a local children's show and continued participating in the following years, receiving recognition for her talent. In 1992, she released her first children album titled Mamo, pušti me. After several years of participating at the Skopje Fest, the Macedonian regional show for a song selection for the Eurovision Song Contest, she signed a contract with the record label Avalon Production in 2000.

Gočeva's discography consists of a total of nine studio albums, spanning pop, R&B rock, traditional folk and ethno, jazz and world musical styles. Shortly after signing her contract with Avalon Production, Gočeva released her debut studio album Jas Imam Pesna which included the song "Nemir" featuring Toše Proeski. Her second, third and fourth studio albums Zošto Sonot Ima Kraj, Znaeš Kolku Vredam and Vo Zaborav were released in 2002, 2003 and 2005, respectively. While her initial five albums were more pop-, R&B-, and rock-oriented, her later records Makedonsko Devojče (2008), Makedonsko Devojče 2 (2014) and Izvor (2018) incorporated elements of Macedonian traditional music and jazz. This switch in sound led to increased popularity, wide acclaim from the public, and sold-out concerts in North Macedonia, Serbia and Bulgaria. Her ninth studio album, in collaboration with Duke Bojadziev and Ismail Lumanovski, Pesni za Ljubov i Kopnež is expected for release on 23 December 2022.

She represented Macedonia in the Eurovision Song Contests 2002 and 2007, ranking 19th and 14th, respectively. Gočeva has received numerous awards and accolades both in North Macedonia as well as other Balkan award ceremonies. She is widely known as the most famous Macedonian female pop singer and has received the label "Macedonian pop princess/queen" and a "pop diva". Although most of her songs are sung in Macedonian, Gočeva has also released records in Serbo-Croatian and English leading to an increase in popularity in Bulgaria and ex-Yugoslav countries such as Serbia, Bosnia and Herzegovina, Montenegro and Croatia. Additionally, Gočeva is renowned for her casual fashion style for which she frequently collaborates with Caci Pakoska. With her music work, Gočeva has also taken part in campaigns against drug use and uterine cancer.

Life and career

1980-1983: Early life and career beginnings
Gočeva was born on 28 April 1980 in Bitola, in then Socialist Republic of Macedonia, part of the Socialist Federal Republic of Yugoslavia to an anesthesiologist father and a technologist mother. She also has a younger sister who is an ophthalmologist. Gočeva finished her primary school in Bitola, where she also performed in a child choir. After that, she went to the high school Josip Broz-Tito in Bitola. As she had an interest in learning foreign languages, she finished her studies in the English language at the Blaže Koneski Faculty of Philology, part of Ss. Cyril and Methodius University of Skopje.

Gočeva first entered the music field at the age of 9, when she performed Madonna's "Like a Prayer" at the popular Šaram Baram show at the Pionerski dom in Bitola. She got her first breakthrough in the music industry in 1990, at the age of 10 when she performed at the first broadcast of the children's festival "Si-Do" in Bitola. A few months later, she participated with another ballad where she won the prize for Best Interpretation. She also participated in the annual festival "Makfest 91" in Štip with the song "Mamo, pušti me" ("Mum, let me go") where she won the award for Most Successful Debut. As her music career was just starting, she used national festivals to promote her voice and talent. In 1992, she released her first children studio album, which contained 11 other songs in addition to "Mamo, pušti me".

Gočeva became a regular participant at Skopje Fest, a contest for the selection of the Macedonian entry for the Eurovision Song Contest, debuting in 1994 with a performance of the song "Koj da ti kaže". In the following years, she continued participating successfully including in 1996, with the song "Ma, ajde kaži mi" ("Come on, tell me") which reached 9th place. In 1998, she participated with "Ukradeni noќi" ("Stolen nights") which was more successful, reaching 4th place with 10,454 televotes.

2000-2002: Jas Imam Pesna and Zošto Sonot Ima Kraj and Eurovision Song Contest 2002 

In 2000, she signed a deal with the record label Avalon Production. Shortly afterwards, her debut studio album Jas Imam Pesna was released through the label. Three singles were released off the first album, including "Sakaj me", "Bez ogled na se" and "Nemir", the latter of which she sang in a duet with Macedonian pop singer Toše Proeski. Following the release of her first studio album, she took part in the Macedonian Eurovision Song Contest. Gočeva's entry "Za nas" written and composed by Darko Dimitrov, landed at second place, with 916 points. 

After promotion through concerts and festivals, she released her second studio album Zošto Sonot Ima Kraj in 2002. The album contained 11 new songs in Macedonian and 3 songs in English. In 2001, she gained wider regional popularity in the countries of former-Yugoslavia, by placing third at the Sunčane Skale festival held on 12, 13 and 14 July in Herceg Novi with the song "Kaži mi", written by Peri and Franc from the band Nokaut. She released "Ti možeš" and "Ke bide se vo red" as singles from the album in North Macedonia. On her album, she included three English versions of her songs titled "I'm looking for Jamaica", "You could", and "Tell me". In 2002, Gočeva was crowned the winner of Skopje Fest 2002 with her entry "Od nas zavisi", which allowed her to represent the Former Yugoslav Republic of Macedonia (FYROM) to a European audience. At the Eurovision Song Contest 2002, she placed 19th. She was also nominated for Miss Eurovision 2002.

2003–2007: Znaeš Kolku Vredam, Vo Zaborav and ESC 2007 

In March 2003, Gočeva released her third studio album Znaeš Kolku Vredam. She released music videos for her songs "Hipokrit", "Ljubov pod oblacite", and "Sreščemo se opet". After 2003, her career expanded to former Yugoslav countries Serbia, Montenegro, Bosnia and Herzegovina, Croatia, and Slovenia, where her albums started being released. To appeal to the wider audience from those countries, Gočeva recorded songs from her third album in Serbian. Her first Serbian language album and fifth overall was titled Kad zvezde nam se sklope... kao nekada; the title song became a success in both Serbia and North Macedonia.

In 2005, Gočeva participated once again in Herceg Novi at the Sunčane Skale festival. Her song "Ruža Ružica" became an instant hit placing her 4th in the festival. She also released her new song "Se lažam sebe", written by Kaliopi. At the end of 2005, she released her fifth studio album titled Vo Zaborav in Macedonian and U Zaboravu in Serbian; the album included a total of nine new songs. The Serbian language version produced numerous singles which gained popularity in many former Yugoslav countries; these included "Teško srcu pada" and "Gorka pilula" as well as "Kad mi nebo bude dom" and "Kao malo vode" written by Zlatan Stipišić Džiboni and Vlatko Stefanovski.

On 24 February 2007, Gočeva participated in, and won, the Skopje Fest competition, held at the Universal Hall in Skopje, with the song "Mojot svet" written by Grigor Koprov and composed by Ognen Nedelkovski. Musically, "Mojot svet" is a power ballad that eulogizes the power of music to "transcend religion and borders". Gočeva obtained a total of 144 points with a maximum of twelve points from every voting district, procuring her a landslide victory. With this feat, she became the first artist to represent FYR Macedonia twice at the Eurovision Song Contest. She competed in the semi-final in Helsinki, Finland on 10 May 2007, performing at number 18. She qualified for the final and performed in the sixth slot on 12 May 2007, where she placed fourteenth in a field of 24 contestants with a score of 73 points.

2007–2014: Makedonsko Devojče 1, Kapka Pod Neboto and Makedonsko Devojče 2 
On 15 December 2007, she participated on Radijski festival with the song "Kad te nema", and finished in 2nd place, winning the award for best composition given by the jury. That same year, she also participated at the Croatian Radio Festival with the song "Jedan Dan". On 26 June 2008, Gočeva released her fifth studio album Makedonsko Devojče, in cooperation with composer Zlatko Origjanski, musician and member of the band Anastasia. As an experimental album arranged and influenced by Nikola Micevski, the project marked a shift in the musical style of the singer as all songs were influenced by local traditional music. "Ptico malečka" was released as the album's first single in North Macedonia and became widely popular. The album was a big critical and commercial success; it won in the category for Best Ethno Album at the 2008 Sunčane skale festival and emerged as the best-selling album of that year in Macedonia. In December 2008, the album was released in Serbia and other ex-Yugoslav countries by City Records.

In May 2009, Karolina announced her single "Kraj" with Serbian R&B/hip-hop artist Wikluh Sky. The single was atop many charts in The Republic of Macedonia and other former Yugoslav republics. She also performed the single at the opening ceremony of Big Brother Serbia. The second single, titled "Za Godina, Dve" (Serbian version: "Uspomene na tebe") is a power ballad about ending a relationship and was released in December 2009. The song became an instant radio hit in The Republic of Macedonia and was further promoted on the Serbian TV show Sve Za Ljubav and on the semi-final of Veliki Brat. In 2010, Gočeva's sixth studio album Kapka Pod Neboto was released on 29 November 2010 along with a Serbian language edition titled Kap Ispod Neba.

On 25 February 2014, Gočeva released the album Makedonsko Devojče 2 as a sequel to the 2008 record; both of them were known under the collective name Makedonsko Devojče due to their distinctive sound. Three singles were released from the album: "Čalgiska" as the lead single on 6 December 2013, "Dve liri (ne ni bilo pišano)" on 13 January 2014 and "Koj da mi zapee" in April 2015. As the first album of the project, Makedonsko Devojče 2 was equally successful and well-received by both the public and music critics who appreciated the combination of traditional folk music with pop elements. Songs from the project were composed and arranged by pianist Nikola Micevski and most lyrics were written by Valentin Skoleski and Vesna Malinova. 

The promotion of the album started at a concert broadcast by MRT with a performance of the song "Dve liri". Other cities across the country where she performed as part of the album's promotion included Bitola, Ohrid and Prilep. A wider tour in promotion of the album took place in Serbia at the Ilija M. Kolarac Endowment in Belgrade and at the Carnegie Hall in New York together with Macedonian composer Duke Bojadziev. The following years after the release of the album were spent on wide promotion through live appearances and regional performances. Makedonsko Devojče 2 emerged as the best-selling album of 2014 in North Macedonia. Additionally, Gočeva broke the record for most held concerts that year with seven. In October 2016, English singer Joss Stone sang "Koj da mi zapee" together with Gočeva at a park in Skopje as part of a series of videos filmed during her visits to various countries as part of her Total World Tour. A professionally recorded video of the performance was published on the official YouTube accounts of both Stone and Gočeva on 18 October 2016.

2018-2020: Izvor 

On 23 February 2018, Gočeva  released Izvor, her ninth studio album in North Macedonia. The album was produced by Micevski while Vesna Malinova served as the main songwriter along with Vesna "Bejbi" Petrushevska. The album was preceded by the Christmas-themed song, "Dzvona" released along with a music video on 19 December 2017. The uptempo track "Beli cvetovi" was released as the album's second single on 31 October 2018. In April 2019, the album was also released in Croatia through Croatia Records, marking the singer's first release in that country. In line with her previous two musical projects, the album is predominantly a pop record with elements of swing, jazz and ethno music. "Ti ne dojde", one of the songs featured on the album, received the accolade for Ethno/World Music Song of the Year at the 2019 Music Awards Ceremony in Belgrade. Promotion of the album took place with a local tour and festival performances across North Macedonia. After successfully promoting the album, the singer took a brief hiatus from the music industry in 2019.

2020-present: Pesni za Ljubov i Kopnež 
From 2020 to 2021, Gočeva started working on her tenth studio album which will include 11 Macedonian songs, mostly "neglected during the years", from the 1950s, 60s, and 70s from authors such as Dragan Gjakonovski Shpato, Dimitar Masevski, Todor Bojadzhiev and Ljubomir Brangjolica among others. The conception of the album was made following her collaboration with Bojadzhiev in 2016, when they sang "Prazno e bez ovaa ljubov", written by Todor Bojadzhiev, at the Metropolis Arena. In 2019, Gočeva moved to New York City where she spent time singing and playing the piano with Bojadzhiev and Lumanovski. Despite their initial plans to release the album in 2020, the project had to be postponed due to the COVID-19 pandemic. Most of the album was recorded at the Macedonian Philharmonic in January 2021; the trio spent two days rehearsing and two days recording due to time constraints and other pandemic-related restrictions.

The first song of the album, titled "Idila" was released with an accompanying music video on 2 June 2021 in collaboration with Duke Bojadzhiev and Ismail Lumanovski. On 5 November 2021, Gočeva released "Krv da ni se stori" in collaboration with Bojadzhiev and Branislav Nikolov, a member of the band Foltin who was featured under the pseudonym Pijan Slavej. On 21 September 2021, Gočeva gave a concert at the Pelister National Park, as part of the project titled "30 Years of Cultural Beauty" which was part of a celebration of 30 years of independence of the country, supported by the Government of North Macedonia. 

On 25 August 2022, Gočeva released "Od nebo do dno", a pop dance song produced by Robert Bilbilov and written by Vladimir Danilovikj and Vesna Malinova. The song marked her first return to the genre after 12 years and it was the singer's intention to make it in line with the trends in music across the world. A dance-inspired music video was also simultaneously released with the song. Music critics and the singer's fanbase were pleased with the song which they saw as a refreshment following her year-long hiatus of making new music. The same day, a Serbian-language version of the song, titled "Ti si moj" was released through Magic Records. On 8 November, it was announced through a press release on Avalon Production, that the album titled Pesni za Ljubov i Kopnež, would be promoted through a concert at the Macedonian Philharmony on 23 December 2022. The following day, the album was released through all digital platforms in North Macedonia. On 31 December 2022, Gočeva appeared on MRT1 where she gave a 90-minute long show. On 25 January 2023, Gočeva performed "Ti si moj" at the first evening of the 2023 Music Awards Ceremony held in Belgrade.

Artistry
Gočeva's music is regarded primarily as pop. She has additionally ventured in many other musical styles of Macedonian ethno music, predominantly incorporating elements of čalgija. With her later projects, Gočeva has also managed to create her own distinctive sound where "all her technical capabilities are on display" and several genres amalgamate. The music released by the singer in the period between 2008 and 2018 involved traditional arrangements mixed with jazz, funk and soul. The modern lyrics of her songs often reflected the positive and negative love experiences of the female protagonist.

During interviews, Gočeva has shared that some of her music influences include Madonna and contemporary artists such as Dua Lipa, Cardi B, Whitney Houston, Cyndi Lauper, Coldplay and Hurts. Additionally, while she was young, her parents frequently took her to concerts held by Yugoslav pop stars in Bitola. Since 2003, she is accompanied by an 8-member band. During an interview, Gočeva revealed that she has always taken part of the creative process and takes part in compiling set lists, discussing the set-up of concerts and song arrangements.

Private life and activism
Despite widespread media speculations about the singer's love life, she has successfully managed to hide it from the press. In September, 2017, Gočeva married Mihail Korubin, a Macedonian artist, after approximately 2 years of dating. During an interview, Gočeva briefly revealed that the two had met during the photo-shooting for the promotional material of the singer's ninth studio album Izvor. The singer's fashion style is created by the stylist Caci Pakovska. During an interview, she revealed that she prefers her style to be loose and casual, especially when performing on stage. Gočeva has been part of several activist movements, predominantly in Croatia. In 2006, she released the song "Bela pesna" with Aki Rahimovski against drug use. In 2010, she collaborated with Maya Sar, Aleksandra Radović and Nina Badrić on the song "Moj je život moja pjesma" which was part of a campaign against uterine cancer.

Discography

Albums

Mamo, pušti me (1992)
Jas Imam Pesna (2000)
Zošto Sonot Ima Kraj (2002)
Znaeš Kolku Vredam (2003)
Kad Zvezde Nam Se Sklope... Kao Nekada (2003)
Vo Zaborav (2005) / U Zaboravu (2006)
Makedonsko Devojče (2008)
Kapka Pod Neboto (2010)
Najubavi Pesni (2012)
Makedonsko Devojče 2 (2014)
Izvor (2018)
Pesni za Ljubov i Kopnež (2022)

Singles 

1991: "Mamo, pušti me"
1992: "Srekjen pat"
1993: "Zamrznato srce"
1993: "Da nema sudbini"
1994: "Koj da ti kaže"
1995: "Isčekuvanje"
1996: "Ma, ajde kaži mi"
1997: "Tonovi tajni"
1998: "Ukradeni noḱi"
1998: "Čuden dožd"
1998: "Edna noḱ"
1998: "Kako da te otkačam"
1998: "Daj mi se"
1999: "Samo za tebe" (featuring Vrčak)
1999: "Sakaj me"
1999: "Bez ogled na se"
2000: "Nemir"/"Pomozi mi" (duet with Toše Proeski)
2000: "Za nas"
2000: "Milenium so tebe"
2001: "Ajde da letame"
2001: "Ti možeš"
2002: "Jamajka"
2002: "Ке bide se vo red"
2002: "Od nas zavisi"
2002: "Štom sakaš"/"Kad voliš"
2003: "Hipokrit"/"Začaren krug"
2003: "Ljubov pod oblacite"/"Ljubov ispod oblaka"
2003: "Sreščemo se opet" (cover of "Nekogaš & negde" by Vlado Janevski)
2004: "Znaeš kolku vredam"/"Znaš koliko vredim"
2004: "Ljubovta e moja religija"
2005: "Se lažam sebe"/"Lažem sebe"
2005: "Ruža ružica"
2005: "Vo zaborav"/"U zaboravu"
2006: "Ova srce znae"/"Teško srcu pada"
2006: "Bela pesna"/"Bjela pesma" (duet with Aki Rahimovski) (Cover of "Bela" by Risto Samardžiev)
2006: "Umiram bez tebe"/"Umirem bez tebe"
2006: "Ti i ja" (duet with Flamingosi)
2007: "Mojot svet"
2007: "Jedan dan"
2007: "Napred Makedonija" (Go Go Macedonia)
2007: "Kad te nema"
2008: "Dafino vino crveno"
2008: "Ptico malečka"
2008: "Za kogo?"
2009: "Kraj"
2009: "Zaboravi" (featuring OT bend)
2010: "Za godina dve"
2010: "Ne se vrakaš"
2012: "Toj"
2013: "Čalgiska"
2014: "Dve liri"
2015: "Koj da mi zapee"
2017: "Dzvona"
2018: "Beli cvetovi"
2020: "Idila"
2021: "Krv da ni se stori"
2022: "Od nebo do dno"/"Ti si moj"

See also

 Music of North Macedonia
 North Macedonia in the Eurovision Song Contest
 Macedonia in the Eurovision Song Contest 2002 
 Macedonia in the Eurovision Song Contest 2007

References

External links

 Official Website
 Karolina Gočeva Profile

1980 births
21st-century Macedonian women singers
Eurovision Song Contest entrants of 2002
Eurovision Song Contest entrants of 2007
Living people
Eurovision Song Contest entrants for North Macedonia
Macedonian pop singers
People from Bitola